Piano wire, or "music wire", is a specialized type of wire made for use in piano strings but also in other applications as springs. It is made from tempered high-carbon steel, also known as spring steel, which replaced iron as the material starting in 1834.

Piano wire has a very high tensile strength to cope with the heavy demands placed upon piano strings; accordingly, piano wire is also used for a number of other purposes, including springs, surgical uses, and in special effects.

History
The oldest record of wire being made for musical instruments is from Augsburg in 1351.

Starting around 1800, the piano began to be built ever more ambitiously, with sturdier (eventually, iron) framing and greater string tension.  This led to innovations in making tougher piano wire.  In 1834, the Webster & Horsfal firm of Birmingham, United Kingdom brought out a form of piano wire made from cast steel; according to Dolge it was "so superior to the iron wire that the English firm soon had a monopoly."  But a better steel wire was soon created in 1840 by the Viennese firm of Martin Miller, and a period of innovation and intense competition ensued, with rival brands of piano wire being tested against one another at international competitions, leading ultimately to the modern form of piano wire.

Manufacture and use
The tensile strength of one popular brand of piano wire is listed as 26202930 MPa (380425 ksi).

Piano Wire Sizes

Other applications
Piano wire is also used in the fabrication of springs, fishing lures, special effects in the movie industry, scaffold cross-bracing, orthodontic and pharyngeal surgery, and for the cutting of cheese and soap.  It is also commonly used in hobby applications such as model railroading, both control line and  radio-controlled aircraft, and knitting. At least in urban legend, it is employed by assassins as a garrote.

See also
 Piano acoustics

Notes

References
 Dolge, Alfred (1911) Pianos and Their Makers: A Comprehensive History of the Development of the Piano from the Monochord to the Concert Grand Player Piano.  Covina Publishing Company.
 Louchet, Jean (2013) The Keyboard Stringing Guide — for the restoration of pianos, harpsichords and clavichords. Published by Lulu.com.

External links
 Jean Louchet, Stringing gauge table and equivalents
 Edward Swenson, Chronologically arranged wire tests.
 Stephen Birkett & Paul Poletti, Reproduction of Authentic Historical Soft Iron Wire for Musical Instruments
 "Steel Music Wire". Report of the Tests of Metals and Other Materials for Industrial Purposes, made with the United States Testing Machine at Watertown Arsenal, Massachusetts, during the Fiscal Year ended June 30, 1894. Government Printing Office, Washington, D. C. 1895

Piano
wire